Dominick Anile Sr. (December 19, 1937 – February 23, 2018) was an American football and baseball player and coach. He served as the head football coach at C. W. Post College—now known as LIU Post—in Brookville, New York from 1968 to 1979.
After stepping away from coaching, he was a scout and administrator for the Cleveland Browns, Carolina Panthers and Indianapolis Colts of the National Football League (NFL).

Head coaching record

Football

References

1937 births
2018 deaths
Carolina Panthers executives
Cleveland Browns scouts
Columbia Lions football coaches
Indianapolis Colts executives
LIU Post Pioneers baseball coaches
LIU Post Pioneers football coaches
LIU Post Pioneers football players
Sportspeople from Brooklyn
Players of American football from New York City